Wudang may refer to:

Places
Wudang District, Guiyang, Guizhou
Wudang Mountains, a mountain range and World Heritage Site in Hubei, China.
North Wudang, a Taoist mountain and temple complex in Shanxi
 Wudang Town, Jiangxi (武当镇), a town in Longnan County

Martial arts
Wudang quan, a class of Chinese martial arts from the Wudang Mountains
Wudang Sect, Wudang Clan, or Wu-Tang Clan, a fictional martial arts sect
Wu Dang (film), a 2012 Chinese martial arts film

See also
Wu-Tang (disambiguation)
Wu Dan (disambiguation)